Leslie Eugene Stratton (10 April 1925 – December 1978) was an English footballer who represented Great Britain at the 1952 Summer Olympics. He played club football for Walthamstow Avenue.

References

1925 births
1978 deaths
English footballers
Walthamstow Avenue F.C. players
Footballers at the 1952 Summer Olympics
Olympic footballers of Great Britain
Association football defenders